Doki (also known as Doki Adventures) is a Canadian animated television series produced by Portfolio Entertainment for Discovery Kids. The series debuted on Discovery Kids in Latin America on April 15, 2013. Doki was renewed for more seasons.

Series overview

Episodes

Special (2009)

Season 1 (2013–14)

Specials (2015–17)

Season 2 (2015–16)

Season 3 (2017–19)

References

External links

Lists of Canadian children's animated television series episodes